This article lists the administrators of Allied-occupied Austria, which represented the Allies of World War II in Allied-occupied Austria from the end of World War II in Europe in 1945 until the re-establishment of Austrian independence in 1955, in accordance with the Austrian State Treaty.

Officeholders 
Source:

American zone 

High Commissioners

British zone 

High Commissioners

French zone 

High Commissioners

Soviet zone

Military commander

High Commissioners

See also 
 History of Austria#Allied occupation
 History of Vienna#Allied occupation
 List of commandants of Vienna Sectors

References 

Administrators Of Allied-Occupied Austria
Administrators Of Allied-Occupied Austria
Allied-occupied Austria, Administrators
Administrators Of Allied-Occupied Austria
Allied-occupied Austria, Administrators